Crain is a surname. Notable people with the surname include:

Rance Crain  (born 1938) publisher, Crain Communications, Inc.. 

Clayton Crain, comic book artist
Dunham Jones Crain (1831–1908), New York politician and diplomat
Floyd H. Crain (born 1929), American politician
Hartwell Crain (1900-1981), American politician
Jeanne Crain (1925–2003), actress
Jesse Crain (born 1981), baseball player
Joel Burditt Crain (1813–1887), Sergeant Major to Sam Houston 
John L. Crain, president of Southeastern Louisiana University
Kurt Crain (1964–2012), American football player
Oleta Crain (1913–2007), African-American military officer, federal civil servant
Robert Crain (1865–1928), American lawyer and farmer
Samantha Crain (born 1986), American musician
Thomas C. T. Crain (1860–1942), New York County D.A.
William C. Crain (1798–1865), New York politician